Melanie Faye (born May 16, 1998), is an American R&B musician and social media personality. She became known after a video of her guitar playing on Instagram went viral in the summer of 2017. She has since performed with artists such as Noname and Mac Demarco. She was a featured artist at the NAMM Show.

Early life and education

Born in Huntsville, Alabama and raised in a Jehovah's Witness household by chemist parents, Faye began writing songs at an early age. Her family moved to Nashville, Tennessee when she was three, and in the third grade she won a music competition run by the Country Music Hall of Fame. She studied jazz guitar at the performing arts high school Nashville School of the Arts.

Career

Faye's guitar skills came to prominence in the summer of 2017 when SZA retweeted a 2016 video of Faye playing her sky blue Fender Stratocaster. Amassing a large number of followers and receiving critical acclaim, she dropped out of school to pursue music full-time. She cites Jimi Hendrix, Michael Jackson, and Eric Gale as major influences on her playing style, which varies between R&B, neo-soul, and funk. She has performed nationwide with associated soul and R&B acts such as Noname, Bibi McGill, Masego, and Dammo. She was featured on the cover of She Shreds magazine, and was chosen by Fender to demo the Player Series of guitars.

Discography

Singles
Melanie Faye EP (August 13, 2020)
It's a Moot Point (March 17, 2020)
Super Sad Always (December 20, 2019)
Eternally 12 (February 1, 2019)

References

External links 

1998 births
Living people
Musicians from Huntsville, Alabama
Musicians from Nashville, Tennessee
21st-century American women guitarists
21st-century American guitarists
African-American guitarists
African-American women musicians
21st-century African-American women
21st-century African-American musicians